Destan may refer to:

Business and entertainment
 Destan (TV series), a Turkish drama series
 Destan Entertainment, a Polish video game company

People

Surname
 Ebru Destan (born 1977), Turkish actress and singer
 Enis Destan (born 2002), Turkish footballer

Given name
 Destan Bajselmani (born 1999), Kosovo footballer
 Destan Haciya (born 1993), Macedonian footballer
 Destan Norman (born 1998), American footballer

See also
 
 Dastan, a form of oral history